Conference of the Birds is a studio album by jazz bassist Dave Holland, recorded in 1972 and released in 1973. It is his fourth project on ECM Records, and his first as a leader. It is credited on the cover to the “David Holland Quartet”. In reference to the album title, the liner notes describe how birds would congregate each morning outside Holland's London apartment and join with one another in song. It features Holland on acoustic double bass, along with tenor saxophonist Sam Rivers, alto saxophonist Anthony Braxton and percussionist Barry Altschul. Braxton and Rivers also play flutes and clarinets throughout the album.

Overview
Holland's compositions for this album had originally been performed live in New York City by a quintet including trumpeter Randy Brecker, tenor saxophonist Michael Brecker, guitarist Ralph Towner and Barry Altschul; "Braxton and Rivers, however, were chosen for the recording as better able to respond to the opportunist disjunctions offered within Holland's compositions."

Each piece on the album is "open form," with a theme stated at the beginning to set key, tempo, and mood. The players are then free to improvise in whatever direction they choose. Stuart Nicholson writes: "Conference of the Birds emerged as a definitive statement of swinging free expression. It was, in essence, a return to the rugged discipline of early 1960s free improvising by working off melodic foundations using the 'time, no changes' principle to achieve greater control over that elusive quarry, freedom."

This is Holland’s second studio collaboration with Anthony Braxton. Holland, Braxton and Altschul also worked together with pianist Chick Corea in Circle from 1970-1971.

Reception
The Penguin Guide to Jazz selected the album as part of its "Core Collection," and gave it a rating of four stars (of a possible four). Jazz critic Michael G. Nastos called the album "[Holland]'s finest hour" and "definitive progressive music."  Steve Huey, writing for Allmusic, calls Conference of the Birds "one of the all-time avant-garde jazz classics, incorporating a wide spectrum of '60s innovations.... This album is a basic requirement for any avant-garde jazz collection, and it's also one of the most varied and accessible introductions to the style one could hope for." The Rolling Stone Jazz Record Guide said the album "only gets more impressive as time passes".

Track listing 
All compositions by Dave Holland.
 "Four Winds" – 6:32
 "Q & A" – 8:34
 "Conference of the Birds" – 4:34
 "Interception" – 8:20
 "Now Here (Nowhere)" – 4:34
 "See-Saw" – 6:40

Personnel 
 Dave Holland – acoustic bass
 Sam Rivers –  reeds, flute
 Anthony Braxton – reeds, flute
 Barry Altschul – percussion, marimba

References

External links

Dave Holland albums
Albums produced by Manfred Eicher
ECM Records albums
1973 albums